
The Crown Minerals Act is an Act of Parliament passed in 1991 in New Zealand. It controls the management of Crown owned minerals. Potential changes to Schedule 4 of the Act created controversy and opposition in 2010. The definition of minerals under the Act is very broad - it includes gravel, industrial rocks, building stone, coal and petroleum.

All gold, silver, uranium and petroleum is under Crown ownership as well as any other minerals that are on Crown owned land.

Schedule 4 Review
In 2009 the National-led government announced that it would review Schedule 4 of the Act, a list of conservation areas for which access for mining cannot be granted by the Minister of Conservation. The proposal was condemned by critics not only because of the potential environmental impacts, but also because of the associated effects that were feared for the tourism industry.

Major NGOs such as Federated Mountain Clubs and Forest and Bird came out in opposition to the plans.

In March 2010 the government requested public feedback on a discussion document on the removal of 7000 ha of land from Schedule 4. There was a record 37,500 submissions on the document. A protest March Against Mining was organised by Greenpeace NZ on 1 May in Auckland  and it attracted an estimated 40,000 people.

On 20 July 2010 the Government announced that in response to receiving 37,552 submissions, the vast majority of which opposed mining, it will not remove any land from Schedule 4.

2013 Amendment
In April 2013 a group of well-known New Zealanders including actress Lucy Lawless, Geoffrey Palmer and Anne Salmond, as well as Greenpeace and Forest & Bird, said proposed amendments by the Crown Minerals (Permitting and Crown Land) Bill suggested by Energy and Resources Minister Simon Bridges were "a sledgehammer designed to attack peaceful protest at sea". This Bill was passed as the Crown Minerals Amendment Act 2013.

See also
Mining in New Zealand

References

Further reading

External links
Text of the Act
Crown Minerals Act at the Ministry of Economic Development
Maximising our Mineral Potential: Stocktake of Schedule 4 of the Crown Minerals Act and beyond - Summary of Submissions

Statutes of New Zealand
1991 in New Zealand law
Mining in New Zealand
Mining law and governance